NLR family pyrin domain containing 9 pseudogene 1 is a protein that in humans is encoded by the NLRP9P1 gene.

References